The Raumanmeri school shooting was a school shooting that occurred on 25 January 1989 at the Raumanmeri secondary school in Rauma, Finland. It was the first school shooting in the history of Finland. A then-14-year-old student at the Raumanmeri secondary school fatally shot two of his classmates using a pistol that belonged to his father. The shooter had claimed to be a victim of bullying. Due to the perpetrator being under the age of 15, he never faced any criminal charges for the attack.

See also

 Gun politics in Finland
 List of school-related attacks
 Jokela school shooting

References

1989 crimes in Finland
School shootings in Finland
Deaths by firearm in Finland
Spree shootings in Finland
School bullying
January 1989 events in Europe
School shootings committed by pupils
1989 murders in Finland
School killings in Finland